These are the list of episodes from Hairy Jeremy

Season 1 (1992) 

Lists of French animated television series episodes